Tracey Elaine Edmonds (née McQuarn; born February 18, 1967) is an American businesswoman, television producer and personality. She is the CEO of Edmonds Entertainment Group Inc and Alrightnow.com and is a former host of the television show Extra. She currently sits on the national board of directors for the Producers Guild of America.

Biography 
Tracey Edmonds has created and produced projects for television, film, music, and digital media. In 2014, Edmonds joined Extra and left the company in 2017. While at Extra, she earned an Emmy Award for co-hosting alongside Mario Lopez and Charissa Thompson. Edmonds currently serves as CEO and President of Edmonds Entertainment. In 2013, Edmonds founded Alright TV, a family- and faith-oriented Web network. Edmonds executive produced Games People Play (BET), a drama about the NBA airing in 2019.

Edmonds resides in Beverly Hills, California with her two sons.

Filmography (producer)

References 

Living people
1967 births
Film producers from California
American film studio executives
Television producers from California
American women television producers
Businesspeople from Los Angeles
Stanford University alumni
African-American businesspeople
American women in business
American women film producers
21st-century African-American people
21st-century African-American women
20th-century African-American people
20th-century African-American women